Springeratus caledonicus, the Caledonian weedfish, is a species of clinid found around New Caledonia and Australia.  This species placement in the family Clinidae has been questioned with some feeling that it is best placed in the family Microdesmidae.

References

caledonicus
Fish described in 1874